Areobindus (died 546) was an official and military commander of the Eastern Roman (Byzantine) Empire. He served as senator in Constantinople and briefly as magister militum in Africa in 545/6. 

Areobindus was sent to Africa by Emperor Justinian I (527–565) following the crisis which had erupted during Sergius's command. Areobindus's retinue included a contingent of Armenian troops led by Artabanes and John, descendants of the royal Armenian Arsacid line.

An inexperienced military commander, Areobindus proved unable to deal with the issue. After the Battle of Thacia, Justinian recalled Sergius and made Areobindus "overal commander" but the mutiny had already spread through the ranks.

In 546, Areobindus was killed in Carthage by the rebel Guntarith (Guntharis), the dux of Numidia. Areobindus was married to Praejecta.

References

Sources
 
 

546 deaths
Generals of Justinian I
Magistri militum
Byzantine North Africa
Assassinated Byzantine people